Port Chester High School is a public high school in Port Chester, New York. It is the senior high school of the Port Chester-Rye Union Free School District and its principal is Mitchell Combs. The school is ranked #134 in the state and #1481 in the United States, according to U.S. News & World Report's 2018 "Best High Schools" rankings.

The school was founded in 1929. The building, on the former grounds of a country club, was designed by Tooker & Marsh in "Harvard" style with a prominent clock tower, and completed in 1932. As constructed, it contained  of space including a  gymnasium, a 1250-seat auditorium, 38 classrooms, two study halls, four shops, and a model apartment for homemaking classes. The building had radio equipment and an electric fire alarm system, and all its clocks were synchronized to an electric master clock.

Academics
The school offers the International Baccalaureate Diploma in addition to Advanced Placement and college-level courses.

Athletics
Port Chester High School competes in Section 1 of the New York State Public High School Athletic Association. The school has teams in football, soccer, volleyball, cross country running, cheerleading, tennis, swimming, basketball, wrestling, indoor track, bowling, baseball, softball, track & field, and golf.

Notable alumni

 Herman Barron (1909–1978), professional golfer
 Jonathan Del Arco (class of 1984), actor and activist
 Joe Langworth (class of 1984), Broadway actor, choreographer and director
 Dan McDonnell (class of 1988), college baseball coach, Louisville Cardinals baseball team head coach
 Ruth Roberts (class of 1944), songwriter of "The First Thing Ev'ry Morning (And the Last Thing Ev'ry Night)" and "Meet the Mets"
 David Tutera (class of 1984), celebrity wedding planner, reality television personality
 Edwin B. Wheeler (class of 1935), General of the US Marine Corps
 Ed Sullivan (1901 - 1974), American television personality

References

Public high schools in Westchester County, New York